Wadworth is a village and civil parish in the Metropolitan Borough of Doncaster in South Yorkshire, England.  It has a population of 1,229, reducing to 1,137 at the 2011 Census.  Notable buildings in the village include Wadworth Hall and the parish church of St John the Baptist.

See also
Listed buildings in Wadworth

References

Villages in Doncaster
Civil parishes in South Yorkshire